Rhynchetria is a genus of moths of the family Crambidae. It contains only one species, Rhynchetria damasales, which is found on Java.

References

Natural History Museum Lepidoptera genus database

Pyraustinae
Crambidae genera
Monotypic moth genera